s-Gravenzande is a town in the province of South Holland, in the Netherlands. Until 2004 it was a separate municipality and covered an area of 20.77 km2 (of which 3.38 km2 water).

The town of 's-Gravenzande had 15,241 inhabitants in 2011. The built-up area of the town was 2.7 km2, and contained 5,879 residences.
The statistical area "'s-Gravenzande", which also can include the peripheral parts of the village, as well as the surrounding countryside, has a population of around 119,750.
As of 1 January 2009, 's-Gravenzande is the largest town in Westland with 19.428 inhabitants.

The former municipality of 's-Gravenzande also included the township of Heenweg.

History

's-Gravenzande is the only place in the Westland with a history as a city.  's-Gravenzande was granted city rights in 1246 by Count William II of Holland who, just like his father Count Floris IV, regularly resided at his estate near the town. It is therefore the only "city" in Westland.

Machteld van Brabant, daughter of Duke Henry I and wife of Floris IV, was responsible for building the town's church, and gave it a Madonna statue to which miraculous powers were attributed. 's-Gravenzande subsequently became a pilgrimage site.

The neighborhood of Gravesend, Brooklyn, New York in the United States is said by some to have been named for 's-Gravenzande. A 1656 Dutch map of Nova Belgica (New Netherland) confirms this, as it shows several Dutch names of towns like Vlissingen (Flushing), Breukelen (Brooklyn), Amersfoort (Flatlands), Heemstee (Hempstead) and Gravesant ('s-Gravenzande).

References

External links
 Forum van de stad 's-Gravenzande

1246 establishments in Europe
Municipalities of the Netherlands disestablished in 2004
Cities in the Netherlands
Populated places in South Holland
Former municipalities of South Holland
Westland (municipality), Netherlands